Jan Rossiter (born September 21, 1987) is a cross-country skier from Ireland. He competed for Ireland at the 2014 Winter Olympics in the Cross-country skiing Men's 15 kilometre classical event.

See also
Ireland at the 2014 Winter Olympics

References

External links
Sochi2014 Profile 

1987 births
Living people
Irish male cross-country skiers
Cross-country skiers at the 2014 Winter Olympics
Olympic cross-country skiers of Ireland